Sokkan (also Romanized as Sokkān and Sakān; also known as Sakun, Seh Gāneh, Sokāneh, and Sokūn) is a village in Pishkuh-e Mugui Rural District, in the Central District of Fereydunshahr County, Isfahan Province, Iran. At the 2006 census, its population was 162, in 35 families.

References 

Populated places in Fereydunshahr County